The MacDonald House bombing was a sabotage attack on the MacDonald House building in Orchard Road, Singapore, on 10 March 1965, just a few months before Singapore's expulsion from Malaysia. The nitroglycerin bomb was planted by Indonesian saboteurs during the period of heightened Indonesia–Malaysia confrontation, also known as the Konfrontasi. The explosion killed three people and injured at least 33 others. At the time, the building was used by HSBC.

During this period, Indonesia openly opposed the formation of Malaysia, perceiving in its view that it was merely a neo-colonial state, especially for the British. Indonesian saboteurs mounted a campaign of terror in Singapore, then a major state and city within Malaysia. There were a total of 37 bombings from 1963 to 1966. They were trained to attack military installations and public utilities. However, when the saboteurs failed in their attempts to attack these installations that were heavily guarded, they set off bombs indiscriminately to create panic and disrupt life in Singapore as well as in Malaysia. 

By 1964, bomb explosions became frequent. To help the police and army defend Singapore from these attacks, a volunteer force was set up. More than 10,000 people signed up as volunteers. Community Centers served as bases for the volunteers to patrol their neighbourhoods. In schools, students underwent bomb drills. The government also warned Singaporeans not to handle any suspicious-looking parcels in the buildings or along streets. Despite the efforts of the British, small groups of saboteurs managed to infiltrate the island and plant bombs. By March 1965, a total of 29 bombs had been set off in Singapore.

Attack
The three Indonesian saboteurs, Harun Said, Osman bin Haji Mohamed Ali and Gani bin Arup, had arrived in Singapore from Java at 11:00 a.m., wearing civilian clothes. They had been instructed to bomb an electric power house but instead headed to MacDonald House. The 10 March 1965 bombing of the MacDonald House was the most serious of  bombings that have occurred in Singapore, when a bomb exploded at 3:07pm at the 10-story building. 

The bomb killed three people; two women who were employees of HSBC, Elizabeth Suzie Choo, 36, a secretary and Juliet Goh, 23, a clerk. The third victim, Mohammed Yasin bin Kesit, 45, a driver and father of eight children, slipped into a coma after the blast, and later died. Thirty-three other people were injured. At the time of the bombing, the building had also housed the Australian High Commission and the Japanese Consulate, and was located just  from the Istana, now the official residence of the President of Singapore.

Arrests and sentencing
Within four days, Singaporean police arrested two marines, Harun Said (then 21) and Osman bin Haji Mohamed Ali (then 23) for the bombing. The two saboteurs were unable to escape due to their motorboat breakdown; one saboteur, Gani bin Arup, managed to flee due to his taking a different route.

As they were in civilian clothes and had targeted a civilian building, the two men were tried in Singapore for the murder of the three people who died in the blast. They were convicted and hanged in Changi Prison on 17 October 1968.

Aftermath

Effects on Indonesia–Singapore bilateral relations

Singapore would gain independence and leave Malaysia on 9 August 1965, just five months after the bombing. In March 1967, the then President of Indonesia, Sukarno, who had initiated the Konfrontasi, resigned from the presidency under pressure by Indonesian military general Suharto amidst the 30 September Movement. A clemency plea by Suharto, who assumed the position of President, was rejected. The Singapore Embassy in Jakarta was ransacked on the day of the saboteurs' hanging. 

Bilateral relations between Singapore and Indonesia would remain tense during the next few years after the bombing. Bilateral relations would improve after 1973, when the then Prime Minister of Singapore, Lee Kuan Yew, in a visit to Indonesia, visited the graves of the two marines and scattered flowers on them, followed by Suharto's visit to Singapore in 1974.

Warship-naming controversy
In 2014, Indonesia named a Bung Tomo-class corvette warship as KRI Usman-Harun, after the two hanged commandos, worsening bilateral ties between Indonesia and Singapore. In response, Singapore cancelled a series of planned inter-military activities and banned the warship from its ports and naval bases and also withdrew its delegation from an international defence meeting, after two Indonesian men at the event were seen dressed in uniform. 

General Moeldoko, Indonesia's military chief, apologised for the naming of the ship, which was accepted by Singapore in a statement by Singapore Defence Minister Ng Eng Hen. Moeldoko however later clarified that the naming of the ship was irreversible.

Memorial
On 10 March 2015, 50 years after the bombing, a memorial dedicated to the victims of the Konfrontasi as well as soldiers who died during that period, was unveiled at Dhoby Ghaut Green, situated across MacDonald House. It was built at the recommendation of the Singapore Armed Forces Veterans League (SAFVL) with the objective as a remembrance of the victims, as well as to educate younger generations about the tragedy. The unveiling was officiated by Minister for Culture, Community and Youth Lawrence Wong, as "a lasting reminder of the victims of Konfrontasi, and those who risked their lives defending our country". Religious leaders from the Inter-Religious Organisation also prayed at the site, before laying a wreath on the monument.

See also
 Indonesia–Malaysia confrontation
 Capital punishment in Singapore
 Usman Haji Muhammad Ali
 Harun Thohir

References
Notes

References

Bibliography

 Brazil, David. Insider's Singapore. Singapore: Times Books International, 2001.

Improvised explosive device bombings in Asia
Terrorist incidents in Singapore
Singapore in Malaysia
Acts of sabotage
March 1965 events in Asia
Attacks on bank buildings
1965 murders in Singapore
Terrorist incidents in Asia in 1965
Terrorism committed by Indonesia
Explosions in 1965
Building bombings in Asia
Murder in Singapore